Easley v. Cromartie, 532 U.S. 234 (2001), is an appeal of the United States Supreme Court case Hunt v Cromartie. The case defendant is Mike Easley, who became North Carolina governor following Jim Hunt. The court's ruling on April 18, 2001, stated that redistricting for political reasons did not violate Federal Civil Rights Law banning race-based gerrymandering. (Case No. 99-1864).

The issue facing this Supreme Court case was Constitutional validity of the Congressional Districts in North Carolina.  Specifically, the 12th district which cut through the southwestern portion of the state.  The complaint of the plaintiff and North Carolina citizens was that the drawing of the district violated the Equal Protection Clause of the Constitution as the district was drawn primarily amongst racial considerations.

The justification of the court stated that in North Carolina, race and politics are strongly correlated.  The district may be majority African American, however, Southern Blacks have strong tendencies to vote Democrat. Voter registrations were used as evidence to prove to the court that the redistricting which drew the 12th district were arguably based on political reasons. In the majority opinion, Stephen G Breyer says "the party attacking the legislatively drawn boundaries must show at the least that the legislature could have achieved its legitimate political objectives in alternative ways that are comparably consistent with traditional districting principles", and in this case, the plaintiffs were not able to make this argument compelling.

Justice O'Connor previously sided with the district courts in Hunt v Cromartie, however, this instance ruled with the North Carolina legislature, acting as the all important swing vote to overturn the previous decision 5–4.  The allegedly odd-shaped district was allowed to stand.

See also
 Shaw v. Reno, 
 Hunt v. Cromartie, 
 List of United States Supreme Court cases, volume 532

References

Further reading

External links
 

United States Supreme Court cases of the Rehnquist Court
United States electoral redistricting case law
2001 in United States case law
Congressional districts of North Carolina
Legal history of North Carolina
2001 in North Carolina
United States Supreme Court cases